The 2016 Chrono des Nations was the 35th edition of the Chrono des Nations cycle race and was held on 23 October 2016. The race started and finished in Les Herbiers. The race was won by Vasil Kiryienka.

General classification

References

2016
2016 in road cycling
2016 in French sport
October 2016 sports events in France